Sant Martí de Riucorb is a municipality in the province of Lleida and autonomous community of Catalonia, Spain. It was created in 1972 by the merger of the former municipalities of Sant Martí de Maldà and Rocafort de Vallbona.

References

External links
 Government data pages 

Municipalities in Urgell